Tempo was a monthly lifestyle published in Istanbul, Turkey. The magazine was established on 6 December 1987. The founder was Mehmet Y. Yılmaz, a Turkish journalist. It featured politics, life, health, society, and entertainment. The magazine was owned and published by Doğan Media Group. It was published on a weekly basis until 2009 when its frequency was changed to monthly. The same year it was also redesigned as a lifestyle magazine.

Regular contributors included Umberto Eco, Murat Belge and Susan Miller. In late 2016 Tempo ceased publication due to financial reasons.

References

External links

1987 establishments in Turkey
2016 disestablishments in Turkey
Defunct magazines published in Turkey
Magazines established in 1987
Magazines disestablished in 2016
Magazines published in Istanbul
Monthly magazines published in Turkey
News magazines published in Turkey
Turkish-language magazines
Weekly magazines published in Turkey
Lifestyle magazines